Brahim Traoré (born 4 February 2004) is a French footballer who plays as a defender for Belgian club SL16 FC on loan from SM Caen.

Club career
A former youth academy player of CO Céaucé and FC Flers, Traoré joined Caen in May 2017 by signing an aspiring contract for five years. He made his professional debut on 3 April 2021 in a 1–1 draw against Pau. This made him the second youngest player to appear for Caen in club history, only behind M'Baye Niang. 

On 31 January 2023, Traoré was loaned by Belgian club SL16 FC, the reserves squad of Standard Liège, with an option to buy.

International career
Born in France, Traoré is of Malian descent. He is a current French youth international.

Career statistics

Club

References

External links
 
 
 SM Caen Profile

2004 births
Footballers from Rennes
French people of Malian descent
Living people
Association football defenders
French footballers
France youth international footballers
Stade Malherbe Caen players
Ligue 2 players
Championnat National 2 players
Challenger Pro League players
French expatriate footballers
Expatriate footballers in Belgium
French expatriate sportspeople in Belgium